2017–2019 is the second studio album released under the Against All Logic moniker by Chilean-American electronic music artist Nicolás Jaar. It was released on February 7, 2020, by Other People.

Critical reception

2017–2019 was met with widespread acclaim reviews from critics.

Accolades

Track listing
All tracks written and produced by Nicolas Jaar.

Sample credits
 "Fantasy" contains samples from "Baby Boy", written by Beyoncé Knowles, Shawn Carter, Sean Paul Henriques, Scott Storch and Robert Waller, as performed by Beyoncé.
 "If Loving You Is Wrong" contains samples from "(If Loving You Is Wrong) I Don't Want to Be Right", written by Homer Banks, Carl Hampton and Raymond Jackson, and performed by Luther Ingram.

The original track listing features 'Fantasy' as track 1, but this track is removed due to an unclear sample. Instead, on the digital version, it was replaced with an 8-track version with the track 'You (Forever)' placed as the first track followed by the remaining tracks as tracks 2-8.

References

2020 albums
Nicolas Jaar albums